Jacob Low (1807 – 14 September 1883) was a former articled clerk turned pastoralist who served as a Member of the Queensland Legislative Assembly in Australia.

Background 
Born in 1807 in Blairgowrie, Perthshire, Low became an articled clerk. In 1846, as a squatter he took up Welltown Station near Goondiwindi, and later acquired Glenearn Cattle Station in Maranoa.

Assembly 
He represented the seat of Balonne from 25 May 1874 (the election of Adam Walker, the previous member for Balonne, was voided, and Low was appointed in his place) to 14 September, 1883, when he died in office. He declared no party affiliation. During debates, Low said that while he had a reputation for protecting Aboriginal Australians from settler violence in the region, he had 'killed many blacks himself', but went on to assert that settlers' private vigilante raids on aboriginal encampments were responsible for 'more bloodshed' than the Native Police who were being blamed.

Low died 14 September 1883 while up for re-election, and was buried in Toowong Cemetery.

References

Members of the Queensland Legislative Assembly
1807 births
1883 deaths
Burials at Toowong Cemetery
19th-century Australian politicians
Scottish emigrants to colonial Australia
19th-century squatters